The Libyan ambassador in Beijing was the official representative of the Government in Tripoli to the Government of the People's Republic of China.

List of representatives
Secretary of the People's Committee of the People's Bureau of the Socialist Peoples Libyan Arab Jamahiriyah in Beijing

References 

 
China
Libya